"I Always Liked That Best" is a song co-written and recorded by American country music artist Cyndi Thomson.  It was released in November 2001 as the second single from the album My World.  The song reached #21 on the Billboard Hot Country Singles & Tracks chart.  The song was written by Thomson, Jennifer Kimball and Tommy Lee James.

Chart performance

References

2001 singles
2001 songs
Cyndi Thomson songs
Songs written by Tommy Lee James
Songs written by Jennifer Kimball
Songs written by Cyndi Thomson
Song recordings produced by Paul Worley
Capitol Records Nashville singles